UFC Fight Night: Cowboy vs. Till (also known as UFC Fight Night 118) was a mixed martial arts event produced by the Ultimate Fighting Championship held on October 21, 2017 at Ergo Arena in Gdańsk, Poland.

Background
This event was the first that the UFC has hosted in Gdańsk and the second in Poland, after UFC Fight Night: Gonzaga vs. Cro Cop 2 in April 2015.

The promotion was initially targeting a middleweight bout between Thiago Santos and promotional newcomer Michał Materla to headline the event. However it was revealed on 1 September that Materla had reneged on his agreement with the UFC and was re-signing with the Polish regional promotion KSW. In turn, Santos was removed from the card and faced Jack Hermansson a week later at UFC Fight Night: Brunson vs. Machida.

Subsequently, a welterweight bout between former UFC Lightweight Championship challenger Donald Cerrone and Darren Till was tabbed as the event headliner.

A heavyweight bout between Dmitry Smolyakov and promotional newcomer Adam Wieczorek was initially scheduled to take place at UFC 214. However, the bout was removed from that card for undisclosed reasons on July 17 and was expected take place at this event. In turn, Smolyakov was removed from the event on October 4 and was replaced by Anthony Hamilton. The bout was scratched a day before the event due to "safety concerns," as a few Lechia Gdańsk ultras – extreme and sometimes violent supporters of the local football team – showed up just prior to the weigh-ins. Wieczorek is a supporter of Ruch Chorzów, a Lechia Gdańsk rival team. The fighters were absent from ceremonial weigh-ins due to that reason, but the bout was eventually canceled and rescheduled for UFC Fight Night: Werdum vs. Tybura a month later.

Promotional newcomer Przemysław Mysiala was expected to face Jimi Manuwa at the event. However, Mysiala could not resign from Absolute Championship Berkut, therefore the bout never materialized.

Teemu Packalén was expected to face Marcin Held at the event. However Packalen pulled out of the fight on October 5 citing a knee injury. He was replaced by promotional newcomer Nasrat Haqparast.

Trevor Smith was expected to face Ramazan Emeev at the event. However, Smith pulled out of the bout in early October citing injury and was replaced by Sam Alvey.

On October 15, it was announced that Jim Wallhead pulled out of his welterweight bout against The Ultimate Fighter: Brazil 3 middleweight winner Warlley Alves due to an injury. He was replaced by promotional newcomer Salim Touahri.

At the weigh-ins, Alvey missed the middleweight limit of 185 pounds, coming in at 189 pounds. He was fined 20% of his purse and his bout with Emeev proceeded at a catchweight.

Results

Bonus awards
The following fighters were awarded $50,000 bonuses:
 Fight of the Night: Brian Kelleher vs. Damian Stasiak
 Performance of the Night: Darren Till and Jan Błachowicz

See also
 List of UFC events
 2017 in UFC

References

UFC Fight Night
2017 in mixed martial arts
Mixed martial arts in Poland
Sports competitions in Gdańsk
October 2017 sports events in Europe
21st century in Gdańsk